James Kelcourse is a member of the Massachusetts Parole Board. Kelcourse was previously a member of the Massachusetts House of Representatives. A resident of Amesbury, Massachusetts, he was elected as a Republican to represent the 1st Essex district. Kelcourse, a former Amesbury city councillor, defeated Newburyport city councillor Ed Cameron in a very close election. He was declared the victor by 11 votes after a month-long recount.

In 2012, Kelcourse ran for the Massachusetts State Senate in the 1st Essex district as an unenrolled candidate. He placed last in the general election.

On June 16, 2021, Kelcourse announced his candidacy for Mayor of the City of Amesbury. On November 2, 2021, in Amesbury's Mayoral election, Representative Kelcourse was defeated by incumbent Mayor Kassandra Gove.

On June 22, 2022, Kelcourse was confirmed by the Massachusetts Governor's Council to be a member of the state parole board. He resigned his position as State Representative on June 29, 2022 before being officially sworn in as a member of the Parole Board.

Kelcourse resides in Amesbury with his wife Amanda and their two children. Kelcourse operates a legal practice in Newburyport, Massachusetts.

Electoral history

See also
 2019–2020 Massachusetts legislature
 2021–2022 Massachusetts legislature

References

Republican Party members of the Massachusetts House of Representatives
Villanova University alumni
Massachusetts School of Law alumni
People from Amesbury, Massachusetts
Living people
21st-century American politicians
1974 births